Peter Ian Archer (8 July 1948 – 13 April 2000) was an Australian entrepreneur and martial arts champion. He appeared as Parsons in the  martial-arts movie Enter the Dragon starring Bruce Lee.

He started a company called Jackel Australia, which markets and distributes baby products and dye products in Australia.

He had a black belt in both Goju-ryu and Shotokan karate. He died of cancer in April 2000.

Archer studied Goju Ryu Karate in Seigo Tada's Odokan in Hong Kong, under Shogi Yuki.

Career
Archer was a successful karate champion in Hong Kong.  During a tournament, Bruce Lee approached him after watching Archer fight.

"Would you like to be in my film?", Bruce asked.

"Sure," Peter responded, "what as?"

"Not sure," Bruce replied; "I'll write something in for you." The film was Enter The Dragon.

The scene where Parson's boat starts to sink, ultimately with the insinuation that Parsons could drown, was not written in the original script.  The little boat was released, as per the script, but the film production team didn't realise the boat had a leak in it.  As the boat started to sink, the film crew panicked.  "Don't worry!  get the shot;  I can swim!" Archer cried, being an Australian who grew up around water.  The director kept filming and the boat continued to sink into the water.  Archer reminisced "It was fine as I was a strong swimmer, but gee that river stank! I was covered in it".

Parson's voice was dubbed by another actor.  The director did not feel that Archer's voice was "New Zealand" enough, though the dubbed voice sounded nothing like a New Zealander's accent.

Archer remembered Lee to be a deeply philosophical man, who loved to discuss and break down the philosophies behind martial arts and life itself. Lee and Archer enjoyed their filmmaking experience together, with Lee reportedly asking Archer to be in his next film. However, neither knew that this film was to be Lee's last.

After fighting in Hong Kong and becoming a karate champion, Archer moved into a business career. He founded Jackel Australia in 1975, becoming the sole Australian and New Zealand Tommee Tippee licensee. He was the creator of the Zoggs Swimwear brand, and was a passionate entrepreneur.

Personal
Archer belongs to a historical Australian family, which explored parts of Queensland and Rockhampton in the early 1800s.  Within this family is also a famous naval architect Colin Archer.

He was born in Queensland to Alexander (Sandy) and June Archer.  Having grown up on a farm, Archer had a down to earth personality - no matter the accomplishments he achieved throughout his short life. He would always joke that "you could take the boy out of the bush, but you can never take the bush out of the boy".

Filmography

References

External links

 Scene from Enter the Dragon The Art Of Fighting Without Fighting

1948 births
2000 deaths
Australian male karateka
Australian male film actors
Deaths from cancer in New South Wales
20th-century Australian male actors